Wirt Henry Wills is an American Southwest archaeologist and a Professor of anthropology at the University of New Mexico. He has written numerous papers and books on the archaeology of the prehistoric southwest. He is most notable for investigations and excavations  in or near New Mexico, including:  the prehistoric site at Bat Cave in Catron County, New Mexico, the Mogollon Su site in western New Mexico and Pueblo Bonito located in Chaco Culture National Historical Park.

Biography
Wills grew up in Virginia on his father's farm which contained many prehistoric and historic sites.  He attributes growing up around old things as a probable stimulus for a desire to work in archeology. The first site he ever worked was in a salt marsh in Lewes, Delaware, at the age of 12 and he has been poking around in sites ever since.

Wills began teaching at the University of New Mexico in 1986, and his fieldwork has continued within the state of New Mexico.

Contributions
Chaco Canyon is the center of Wills' work. For his dissertation, Dr. Wills wrote an article that was later published in the journal of field archaeology entitled The Preceramic to Ceramic Traditions in the Mongollon Highlands of Western New Mexico that focused on his excavation of a pit house on the SU site.

Excavations at Pueblo Bonito, Chaco Canyon's most famous site, is what sets him apart from most American anthropologists.  Dated roughly from 919-1067 C.E., this vast structure consists of over 800 rooms that took 150 years to construct.  The rooms served as living areas, religious centers and even storage units.

Economic theory
An essential part of Wills' economic theory separates a site's storage capacity and intensification. Wills' ecological interests focused on sophisticated analyses of prehistoric subsistence, agriculture, and storage practices. In his work with the Pit house Agriculture he stated “Large crop yields or high levels of domesticate consumption might be the product of intensification, but not necessarily”.

Women’s Economic intensification
Wills' work on the “Archaeology of Gender in the American Southwest” focused on both time allocation and economic intensification.  His contributions to economic intensification were key to identifying some of the origins of southwestern ceramic containers.

Future projects
Wills has been actively involved in the Chaco Stratigraphy project from 2006 to the present. The Chaco Stratigraphy Project is an interdisciplinary research program at the University of New Mexico involving field investigations in Chaco Canyon, New Mexico. Chaco was the center of an unprecedented cultural development between ca. AD 800 and 1200 known as the "Chaco Phenomenon."  Wills is hoping that the Chaco Stratigraphy Project will contribute to a greater understanding of the human experience in Chaco through detailed studies of socioeconomic change, with an emphasis on agricultural production and technology during the Bonito phase (ca. AD 850 – 1140).

Publishing
As a scholar, Wills has written and co-authored many articles and books dealing with Southwestern Archaeology. The first book co-written by Wills was entitled “The Archaeological Correlates of Hunter-Gatherer Societies: Studies From the Ethnographic Record” in 1980. Wills has also written extensive articles that have been published by the journal of field archaeology. In 2006, Wills wrote “The Late Archaic Across the Borderlands: From Foraging to Farming” which described the transition of foraging for food to the use of agriculture for food development.

Selected work
(1980) Archaeological Correlates of Hunter-Gatherer Societies: Studies From the Ethnographic Record.
(1994) The Ancient Southwestern Community: Models and Methods for the Study of Prehistoric Social Organization.
(2006) The Late Archaic Across the Borderlands: From Foraging to Farming.
 (1988)

With others
(1994) 
Wills, Wirt H. And Crown, Patricia.
(1996) The Preceramic to Ceramic Traditions in the Mongollon Highlands of Western New Mexico
(1995) “The Archaeology of Gender in the American Southwest ” Journal of Anthropological Research, Vol. 51, No. 2.

References

External links
The Chaco Stratigraphy Project
The Chaco Culture national historic Park
Wills' Curriculum Vitae
The Mystery of Chaco Canyon

Year of birth missing (living people)
Living people
American anthropologists
American archaeologists
University of New Mexico faculty